Harpagidia amplexa is a moth in the family Gelechiidae. It was described by Edward Meyrick in 1925. It is found in China in Guangdong and Hong Kong.

References

Moths described in 1925
Dichomeridinae